Newman Central Catholic High School is a diocesan Catholic high school in Sterling, Illinois.  It is located in the Roman Catholic Diocese of Rockford.

It was founded as St. Mary High School in 1915, a parochial school attached to St. Mary's Parish. It later moved across the street and became Community Catholic High School. It adopted its present name when it moved into its current facilities in 1960. It was staffed in its early years by the Sisters of Loreto, but nearly all the staff today is laity.

Drawing primarily from Sterling, Rock Falls, and Dixon, but also from cities such as Oregon and Amboy. According to the statistics taken, Newman's enrollment for 2022-2023 is 215 students.

Athletics
The Newman Comets (and Lady Comets) participate in IHSA athletics and activities. They play under the Three Rivers Athletic Conference in all sports.

The Newman Comets boys' football team, known as "The Blue Machine," won the IHSA State Championship in 1990, 1994, 2004, 2010, 2013, and 2019 and placed second in 1993 and 1998. Championships 1990, 1994, 2004, 2010, and 2013 were all won under Coach "Papo" Papoccia, before his eventual retirement in 2018. Coach Brandon Kreczmer took the role as head coach, leading the Newman team to a victorious state run in 2019. The team is now under the advisory of head coach Michael LeMay.

Another IHSA State Championship belongs to Boys' Cross Country in 2009-2010. A few years later in the 2012-2013 season, Newman Cross Country went on a seven year streak of team appearances at the IHSA State Championship, with the team being led by such names as Bryson Reyes, Drew Rosengren, Chris Ahlers, Spencer Mauch, and Shay Hafner. This streak ended with the 2019-2020 season, only to be revitalized with the 2021-2022 boys team, under a new young core of Lucas Schaab, Lucas Simpson, Kenny Boesen, Carver Grummert, and Espen Hammes.

Other notable State appearances and victories include: Boys' Wrestling (1984-1985, 2010-2011). The Newman Boys' track team won the 2013 Class A State Championship. In 2019 senior Brody Ivy became a state champion in Class 1A IHSA wrestling. In 2018 the Newman boys basketball team placed third at the IHSA Class 1A state championships.

References

External links
 Newman Central Catholic High School homepage
 IHSA Newman Webpage 
 Newman's Athletic Record

 

Roman Catholic Diocese of Rockford
Catholic secondary schools in Illinois
Schools in Whiteside County, Illinois
Educational institutions established in 1915
1915 establishments in Illinois